CNA938 is an English radio station of Mediacorp in Singapore. Since mid-2019, the station runs as the complementary to its parent television counterpart in line with the latter's 20th anniversary. CNA938 broadcasts news and talk programmes from 06:00 to 23:59 SST daily, followed by an audio simulcast of CNA during overnight hours.

History

NewsRadio 938 (1998 - 2004)
The 93.8 MHz frequency was originally known as NewsRadio 938 and was officially inaugurated on 1 January 1998 by then Singapore President Ong Teng Cheong. The brand was founded under the Radio Corporation of Singapore (RCS), which took over Singapore Broadcasting Corporation (SBC)'s radio-broadcasting operations on 1 October 1994 when it was privatised under Mediacorp's predecessor Singapore International Media (SIM Group of Companies). When the Television Corporation of Singapore (TCS) rebranded to MediaCorp on 12 February 2001, RCS subsequently became MediaCorp Radio.

938LIVE (2005 - 2017)
NewsRadio 938 rebranded as 938LIVE in 2005. A number of a new programmes and a stronger focus on news were introduced later in 2015.

938NOW (2017 - 2019) 
On 6 November 2017, the station was relaunched with a new name, 938NOW, with a number of a new programmes and a stronger focus on news and lifestyle. It has expanded its content to include more tips and insights from experts in business, finance, health and wellness, medicine, parenting, food, technology, leisure, sports and travel. The station's new tagline was “In The Know, On The Go.”

CNA938 (2019 - present) 
In March 2019, in conjunction with CNA's 20th anniversary, Mediacorp announced that the station will be rebranded as CNA938 (initially as CNA Talk). The new radio station was launched on 3 June that year.

See also
List of radio stations in Singapore

References

External links
 
 

Radio stations in Singapore
Radio stations established in 1998
1998 establishments in Singapore